TPCS may refer to:

Tire Pressure Control System
The Pop Culture Suicides, a band
Transcranial pulsed current stimulation (tPCS), a form of non-invasive brain electrical stimulation 
 Tóth-Plósz Család

See also 
TPC (disambiguation)